Mark McEwan is an American-born Canadian celebrity chef based in Toronto, Ontario.

He was head judge on Food Network Canada's Top Chef Canada. McEwan had his own television show on Food Network Canada entitled The Heat, which followed his catering team from North 44 Caters as they served the influential and elite.

Since 1990, Mark has been an ambassador for Second Harvest in Toronto, helping to spread the word about food rescue and hunger relief. He also has partnered with the Sunnybrook Foundation and sits on the board of his alma mater, with George Brown Foundation.

Career
McEwan was born and raised in Buffalo, New York. McEwan's first restaurant job was as a dishwasher in Buffalo at Mindy’s Wine Cellar, making $1.60 an hour. McEwan graduated from George Brown College in 1979. In 1981, McEwan was hired by the Sutton Place Hotel in Toronto as executive sous chef. Two years later he was promoted to chef. He opened his first restaurant, North 44, in 1990.

Around 2002, he opened Bymark restaurant in the Financial District, Toronto. In August 2007, McEwan opened ONE at the Hazelton Hotel, a luxury hotel in Yorkville, Toronto. In 2010, McEwan opened Fabbrica, an Italian restaurant, at Shops at Don Mills. In June 2009, McEwan opened a $6 million, gourmet food supermarket "McEwan" at Shops at Don Mills. In July 2015, McEwan opened a second 6,000 square foot location in the PATH at the TD Centre. In 2012, McEwan was commissioned by US-based OTG Management to aid in the opening of two restaurants, Fetta Panini Bar and  Heirloom Bakery Café, in Toronto Pearson International Airport, consulting on their opening menus. McEwan, his grocery store, also creates "grab-and-go" items such as sandwiches, salads, snack boxes, and meals that are sold throughout the airport at 10 different kiosks.

McEwan's first book, Great Food at Home, was published in early 2011 and his second book Rustic Italian is based on the recipes from Fabbrica. McEwan teamed up with Jascor/Fresco in 2011 to brand a set of cookware that is now sold on the Shopping Channel and Hudson's Bay across Canada.

Restaurants

Active 
 Bymark (2008–present), 66 Wellington Street W, Toronto, Ontario, Canada
 Fabbrica TD Centre (2018–present), 66 Wellington Street W, Toronto, Ontario, Canada

Closed or inactive 
 ONE Restaurant (2007–2022), Hazelton Hotel, Toronto, Ontario, Canada, however as of 2022 McEwan is no longer a partner
 Fabbrica (2010–2020), 49 Karl Fraser Road, Toronto, Ontario, Canada
 North 44 (1990–2018), 2537 Yonge Street, Toronto, Ontario, Canada
 McEwan Fine Foods (2019–2021), specialty grocery store, Toronto, Ontario, Canada

Filmography
Television appearances
 The Heat with Mark McEwan - host
 Superstar Chef Challenge - judge
 Top Chef Canada - head judge
 Wall of Chefs - judge
 Chef to Chef

References

External links
 Bymark Restaurant
 FABBRICA Restaurant
 
 Mark McEwan at the Chef and Restaurant Database

1957 births
Living people
Canadian television chefs
Canadian restaurateurs
Canadian infotainers
Businesspeople from Buffalo, New York
Businesspeople from Toronto
George Brown College alumni
Canadian cookbook writers
Writers from Buffalo, New York
Writers from Toronto
Canadian male chefs
American emigrants to Canada
Chefs from Toronto